Daniel Zeng from the University of Arizona and CAS Institute of Automation, Tucson, Arizona was named Fellow of the Institute of Electrical and Electronics Engineers (IEEE) in 2016 for contributions to collaborative computing with applications to security informatics.

References 

Fellow Members of the IEEE
Living people
University of Arizona faculty
21st-century American engineers
Carnegie Mellon University alumni
Year of birth missing (living people)